Leaving All Behind is the self-released debut EP/demo by American power metal band Cellador.

Track listing 
"Leaving All Behind"  – 3:13
"Seen Through Time"  – 7:09
"Forever Unbound"  – 5:59
"No Chances Lost"  – 6:31

Credits 
 Michael Gremio – vocals
 Chris Petersen – guitars
 Sam Chatham – guitars
 Valentin Rakhmanov – bass
 David Dahir – drums, percussion

Additional information 
A drum machine was used on all tracks.
Michael Gremio was still known as Michael Smith Jr. at the time of recording.
All songs written by Chris Petersen except track 4 by Petersen and Josh Krohn.

2005 EPs